David Pagel is an American art critic, educator, curator, dioramatist and bike enthusiast.

Contemporary art criticism
Since 1991, Pagel has been a regular contributor to the Los Angeles Times. He is a professor of art theory and history at Claremont Graduate University, where he has taught in the art department since 1994. He is also an adjunct curator at the Parrish Art Museum in Water Mill, New York.

Pagel has written numerous essays for exhibition catalogs by such artists as Jim Isermann, Rodney Carswell, Roy Dowell, David Klamen, Michael Reafsnyder, Robert Zakanitch, Tim Bavington, Sush Machida, Leslie Love Stone, Ron Nagle, Elizabeth Patterson, Asad Faulwell, Wendell Gladstone, and Irene Hardwicke Olivieri.

He was the recipient of an Andrew W. Mellon Fellowship in Contemporary Arts Criticism in 1990 and was a Macgeorge Fellow at the University of Melbourne in Australia in 2002.

Curatorial activities
David Pagel has curated:
Unfinished Business at the Parrish Art Museum (2016)
Pieceable Kingdom at the Beacon Arts Building (2011)
Underground Pop at the Parrish Art Museum (2010)
LA Now at the Las Vegas Art Museum (2009)
Painting Design at Claremont Graduate University (2007)
702 Series: Sush Machida Gaikotsu at Las Vegas Art Museum (2007)
POPulence at Blaffer Gallery, University of Houston (2005) 
Damaged Romanticism: A Mirror of Modern Emotion (with Terrie Sultan) for the Blaffer Gallery at the University of Houston (8/22/08-11/15/08) and the Grey Art Gallery at New York University (1/13/09-4/4/09)
Electric Mud at the Blaffer (1/17/09-3/28/09)

Education
M.A., Harvard University, Art History 1987
B.A., Stanford University, Modern Thought and Literature, with Honors and Distinction in the Humanities, 1985

Bibliography
Darren Waterston: Representing The Invisible by Dave Hickey, David Pagel
Irene Hardwicke Olivieri : Paintings by David Pagel
Plane/Structures by David Pagel
Fifteen: A Fifteen-Year Survey of Jim Isermann's Work by David Pagel
The Smiths (Seton Smith, Kiki Smith and Tony Smith) by Gilbert Brownstone, Eleanor Heartney and David Pagel
Postmark : An Abstract Effect by Louis Grachos and David Pagel 
The Cowboys Stadium: Art + Architecture by David Dillon and David Pagel

References

American art critics
American art historians
American art curators
Cultural historians
Claremont Graduate University faculty
Harvard University alumni
Stanford University alumni
Year of birth missing (living people)
Living people